Monochroa cytisella is a moth of the family Gelechiidae. It is found in most of Europe.

The wingspan is 10–12 mm. The head is ochreous-whitish. Forewings are ochreous - yellowish, towards costa sprinkled or suffused with fuscous; a yellowish-white streak from 4/5 of costa towards termen, not reaching it; usually an indistinct outwardly oblique whitish tornal mark. Hindwings are grey.

Adults are on wing in July. There is one generation per year.

The larvae feed on Pteridium aquilinum. The larvae feed in a slight gall in the main stem of bracken, often withering an adjacent side stem.

References

External links
UKmoths
Fauna Europaea

Monochroa
Moths of Europe
Moths described in 1837